Pietro Francisci (9 September 1906 – 1977) was an  Italian film director, best remembered for the film Hercules (1958) which inspired the sword and sandal boom of the late 1950s and early 1960s. Born in Rome, his career took a distinct turn for the worse after he directed the 1966 science-fiction film 2+5 Missione Hydra, released in the U.S. in 1977 as Star Pilot.

Selected filmography
 I Met You in Naples (1946)
 Anthony of Padua (1949)
Le Meravigliose avventure di Guerrin Meschino (1951)
Attila (1954)
Hercules (1958)
Hercules and the Queen of Lydia (1959) aka Hercules Unchained
Siege of Syracuse (1960)
 The Warrior Empress (1960)
 Hercules, Samson and Ulysses (1960)
2+5 Missione Hydra (1966) aka Star Pilot
 Sinbad and the Caliph of Baghdad (1973)

External links
 

1906 births
1977 deaths
Film directors from Rome